Betty W. Liu is the Executive Vice Chairman of the New York Stock Exchange and the Chief Experience Officer of Intercontinental Exchange. Liu joined the NYSE Group after ICE acquired Radiate, the ed-tech startup she founded. Liu is a former news anchor for Bloomberg Television, a subsidiary of Bloomberg L.P. A business journalist, Liu regularly interviewed influential business, political and media leaders including Warren Buffett, Elon Musk, and Arianna Huffington.

Liu was the founder and CEO of ed-tech startup Radiate, based in New York City.

Early life
Liu was born in Hong Kong, moved to the United States when she was three years old, and from age twelve was raised in Philadelphia. Liu attended Central High School.

Education 
Liu graduated magna cum laude in 1995 from the University of Pennsylvania with a degree in English.

Career
Liu started her career in financial journalism as a Hong Kong-based regional correspondent and youngest Taiwan Bureau Chief for Dow Jones Newswires.

After she left Dow Jones, she worked for several years as the Atlanta Bureau Chief for the Financial Times, where she broke stories on top corporate and political leaders such as Coca-Cola ex-chief executive Douglas Daft, former Home Depot CEO Bob Nardelli, and former U.S. President Jimmy Carter.

Returning to Asia as an anchor and correspondent for CNBC Asia, Liu covered the daily market action in the Greater China region for all of CNBC's morning shows, including for CNBC's Squawk Box.

Over the course of her career, she has also written for The Wall Street Journal and Far Eastern Economic Review

From 2007 to 2018, she worked for Bloomberg Television, formerly anchoring "In the Loop with Betty Liu" from its inception in 2007 until the show's cancelation in June 2015, which was replaced with "Market Movers".  Liu then anchored the morning program "Daybreak Asia" out of NYC and was an Editor-at-Large at Bloomberg.  She also hosted "In the Loop, At the Half" on Bloomberg Radio.

In 2017 Liu founded RadiateInc.com, a subscription website offering business micro-lessons from the top CEOs.

Liu became High Point University's Media Entrepreneur in Residence in October 2017.

Radiate Inc was acquired by Intercontinental Exchange in 2018, and Liu became Executive Vice Chairman of ICE.

In 2021, Liu founded D and Z Media Acquisition Corp, a SPAC that focuses on the emerging subscription economy.

Awards
In 1997, she received a Dow Jones Newswires Award for her coverage of the Asian financial crisis.

Her coverage while at FT of the biggest Fortune 500 companies based in the South (Coca-Cola, Home Depot, UPS, FedEx) earned her a spot on TJFR's "Top 30 business journalists under 30 list" three years in a row (2000–2002).

On October 27, 2011, Betty Liu became the first female and Asian student to be inducted into Central High School's Alumni Hall of Fame.

In 2012, Bloomberg TV ran an advertising campaign incorrectly touting Liu as "Pulitzer Prize-nominated". When contacted by msnbc.com, Bloomberg TV acknowledged the error and said it would correct the ads. The same claim of a Pulitzer nomination was made by the publisher of her biography, Age Smart: Discovering the Fountain of Youth at Midlife and Beyond.

Personal life 
Liu has been married twice, first to Ohio neurologist Benjamin L. Walter (also a Central High School graduate, whom she married on September 14, 2002 and divorced in 2006) and then to William Browning, an Australian news executive whom she met in Hong Kong. They divorced in 2012.

Liu is a mother of twin boys, Dylan and Zachary, who were born July 21, 2004, by her first husband. They live in Millburn, New Jersey.

Liu is fluent in Mandarin, and speaks some Cantonese.

Bibliography
 Jeffrey A. Rosensweig, Ph.D. and Betty Liu, Age Smart: Discovering the Fountain of Youth at Midlife and Beyond (Upper Saddle River, New Jersey: Prentice Hall, April 2006 )
 Betty Liu, Work Smarts: What CEOs Say You Need To Know to Get Ahead (Hoboken, New Jersey: John Wiley & Sons, December 9, 2013 )

See also
 Chinese Americans in New York City
 New Yorkers in journalism

References

External links
 Official website at Bloomberg.com
 "The Business of Life," Betty Liu, CNBC
 
 

American business and financial journalists
American journalists of Chinese descent
American television news anchors
American television reporters and correspondents
American women television journalists
American writers of Chinese descent
Bloomberg L.P. people
Hong Kong emigrants to the United States
Living people
People from Millburn, New Jersey
University of Pennsylvania alumni
Central High School (Philadelphia) alumni
1973 births
American women chief executives
Women business and financial journalists
American women journalists of Asian descent
21st-century American women